Polk County is a county located in the southwestern portion of the U.S. state of Missouri. As of the 2010 census, the population was 31,137. Its county seat is Bolivar. The county was organized January 5, 1835, and named for Ezekiel Polk.

Polk County is part of the Springfield, MO Metropolitan Statistical Area.

History
Polk County was separated and organized from Greene County on January 5, 1835. A supplement to the boundary change was made on March 13, 1835. Its original boundaries were later reduced in creating Dade, Dallas, and Hickory counties. It was named in honor of Col. Ezekiel Polk of Tennessee, a soldier who served under General George Washington and who was the grandfather of John Polk Campbell and Ezekiel Madison Campbell, brothers who helped to settle Polk and Greene counties. Ezekiel Polk was also the grandfather of James K. Polk, who was a member of the US House of Representatives in 1835. He was elected President of the United States in 1844.

Geography

Adjacent counties
Hickory County (north)
Dallas County (east)
Greene County (south)
Dade County (southwest)
Cedar County (west)
St. Clair County (northwest)

Major highways
 Route 13
 Route 32
 Route 83
 Route 123
 Route 215

Demographics

As of the census of 2000, there were 26,992 people, 9,917 households, and 7,140 families residing in the county.  The population density was 42 people per square mile (16/km2).  There were 11,183 housing units at an average density of 18 per square mile (7/km2).  The racial makeup of the county was 97.26% White, 0.45% Black or African American, 0.67% Native American, 0.19% Asian, 0.03% Pacific Islander, 0.33% from other races, and 1.06% from two or more races. Approximately 1.30% of the population were Hispanic or Latino of any race.

There were 9,917 households, out of which 33.00% had children under the age of 18 living with them, 60.50% were married couples living together, 8.20% had a female householder with no husband present, and 28.00% were non-families. 23.20% of all households were made up of individuals, and 10.70% had someone living alone who was 65 years of age or older.  The average household size was 2.56 and the average family size was 3.02.

In the county, the population was spread out, with 25.70% under the age of 18, 12.60% from 18 to 24, 25.50% from 25 to 44, 20.80% from 45 to 64, and 15.30% who were 65 years of age or older.  The median age was 35 years. For every 100 females, there were 94.90 males.  For every 100 females age 18 and over, there were 90.90 males.

The median income for a household in the county was $29,656, and the median income for a family was $35,843. Males had a median income of $25,383 versus $18,799 for females. The per capita income for the county was $13,645.  About 11.10% of families and 16.30% of the population were below the poverty line, including 20.00% of those under age 18 and 12.00% of those age 65 or over.

2020 Census

Education

Public libraries
Polk County Public Library

Politics

Local
The Republican Party completely controls politics at the local level in Polk County. Republicans hold all of the elected positions in the county.

State

All of Polk County is in the 128th district in the Missouri House of Representatives, and is represented by Mike Stephens (R-Bolivar).

All of Polk County is a part of Missouri's 28th District in the Missouri Senate, which is currently vacant. The previous incumbent, Mike Parson, was elected Missouri Lieutenant Governor in November 2016.

Federal

All of Polk county is included in Missouri's 7th Congressional District and is currently represented by Billy Long (R-Springfield) in the U.S. House of Representatives.

Political culture
Polk County has been a Republican Party stronghold for most of its history at the presidential level. In only four presidential elections from 1896 to the present has a Democratic Party candidate carried the county, the most recent being Lyndon B. Johnson in 1964.

Missouri presidential preference primary (2008)

Former Governor Mike Huckabee (R-Arkansas) received more votes, a total of 2,317, than any candidate from either party in Polk County during the 2008 presidential primary.

Media
The Bolivar Herald-Free Press is published twice weekly.

Communities

Cities
Bolivar (county seat)
Fair Play
Humansville
Morrisville
Pleasant Hope

Villages
Aldrich
Flemington
Goodnight
Halfway

Unincorporated communities

Adonis
Brighton
Burns
Cliquot
Dunnegan
Eudora
Goodson
Graydon Springs
Huckaby
Huron
Karlin
Knox
Mohawk Corner
Polk
Rimby
Rock Prairie
Rondo
Schofield
Sentinel
Slagle
Sunset
Tin Town
Van
Violet
West Bend
Wishart

Townships
Polk County is divided into 22 townships:

 Campbell Township
 Cliquot Township
 East Looney Township
 East Madison Township
 Flemington Township
 Jackson Township
 Jefferson Township
 Johnson Township
 McKinley Township
 Mooney Township
 North Benton Township
 North Green Township
 Northeast Marion Township
 Northwest Marion Township
 South Benton Township
 South Green Township
 Southeast Marion Township
 Southwest Marion Township
 Union Township
 West Looney Township
 West Madison Township
 Wishart Township

See also
National Register of Historic Places listings in Polk County, Missouri

References

External links
http://www.bolivarmonews.com/
 Digitized 1930 Plat Book of Polk County  from University of Missouri Division of Special Collections, Archives, and Rare Books
 Polk County Sheriff's Office

 
1835 establishments in Missouri
Populated places established in 1835
Springfield metropolitan area, Missouri